Manuel António dos Santos (born 5 December 1943 in Mirandela) is a Portuguese politician who served as Member of the European Parliament for the Socialist Party, part of the Party of European Socialists, from 2001 until 2019.

References

External links
 

1943 births
Living people
Socialist Party (Portugal) MEPs
MEPs for Portugal 2004–2009
MEPs for Portugal 1999–2004
MEPs for Portugal 2014–2019